Casual or Casuals may refer to:

Casual wear, a loosely defined dress code
Business casual a loosely defined dress code
Smart casual a loosely defined dress code
Casual Company, term used by the United States military to describe a type of formation.
Casual employment, an employment classification
Casual (subculture), a British football hooligan trend which emerged in the early 1980s
Casuals F.C. (1883–1939), a football club
Casual (TV series) (2015–2018), an American comedy-drama series

Music
Casual (rapper) (born 1973), American rapper
The Casuals (1961–1976), a British pop group
Original Casuals, previously The Casuals, a 1950s American doo-wop group
"Casual", a 1998 song by Hieroglyphics from the album 3rd Eye Vision
"Casual", a 2018 song by Doja Cat from the album Amala

See also
Casual game
Casualty (disambiguation)